Elisa Molinarolo (born 29 January 1994) is an Italian female pole vaulter, that won two national championships She competed at the 2020 Summer Olympics in pole vault.

Biography
In 2018, establishing her Personal Best with 4.35 m, 6th best Italian performance of all-time and at the middle of season had reached the 57th place in the world lists.

Personal best
Outdoor
Pole vault: 4.55 m -  Florence, 15 May 2021

Indoor
Pole vault: 4.52 m -  Ancona, 18 February 2023

National titles
Molinarolo won four national championships at individual senior level.

 Italian Athletics Championships
 Pole vault: 2017,  2021 (2)
 Italian Athletics Indoor Championships
 Pole vault indoor: 2020, 2022 (2)

See also
 Italian all-time lists - Pole vault

References

External links
 

1994 births
Living people
Italian female pole vaulters
Athletes (track and field) at the 2020 Summer Olympics
Olympic athletes of Italy
Athletics competitors of Fiamme Oro